Tracey Hinton (born 19 March 1970) is a Paralympic athlete being visually impaired and classed as T11 in the Paralympic classification system. Born in Cardiff and a member of Cardiff Amateur Athletic Club, Hinton has been blind since having cancer of the retina aged four which resulted in her losing her sight. She has won three silver and three bronze medals at Paralympic level.

She competed in the 1992 Summer Paralympics winning a silver medal in the 400m B1, a silver medal in the 200m B1 and a bronze medal in the 100m B1. 2000 saw her win bronze medals in the T11 200m and T11 400m and silver in the T12 800m. She is the 800 metres world record holder in her class with a time of 2mins:17.66secs.

Hinton has been selected to compete in the 2012 Summer Paralympics, her sixth games. She was chosen as captain of the women's athletics squad for Great Britain at the 2012 Summer Paralympics.

Hinton participated at the 2014 Commonwealth Games in the T11/T12 100m, qualifying for the final with a run of 13.79 seconds with her guide Stefan Hughes.

References 

Sportspeople from Cardiff
Paralympic athletes of Great Britain
1970 births
Living people
Athletes (track and field) at the 1992 Summer Paralympics
Athletes (track and field) at the 1996 Summer Paralympics
Athletes (track and field) at the 2000 Summer Paralympics
Athletes (track and field) at the 2004 Summer Paralympics
Athletes (track and field) at the 2008 Summer Paralympics
Athletes (track and field) at the 2012 Summer Paralympics
Paralympic bronze medalists for Great Britain
Paralympic silver medalists for Great Britain
World record holders in Paralympic athletics
Commonwealth Games competitors for Wales
Athletes (track and field) at the 2014 Commonwealth Games
Medalists at the 1992 Summer Paralympics
Medalists at the 2000 Summer Paralympics
Welsh female sprinters
Welsh female middle-distance runners
Welsh Paralympic competitors
Medalists at the World Para Athletics Championships
Medalists at the World Para Athletics European Championships
Paralympic medalists in athletics (track and field)
Paralympic sprinters
Visually impaired sprinters